Asaf Jafarov (28 July 1927, in Baku – 3 April 2000, in Baku) was a People's Artist of the Azerbaijani SSR

Early life and education
Asaf Jafarov was born on July 28, 1927 in Old City (Baku). His first education was at Painting School named after Azim Azimzade in 1945-1950. In 1951-1957 he continued his education at Surikov Moscow Art Institute.

Career 
In 1957 he was sent to India and Pakistan for creative trips by the Institute. 
His works are mostly in still life, thematic picture and portrait genres. Asaf Jafarov created a new gallery of works with his own composition, coloring and designs. National colors, folklore and traditional content are dominant in the artist's creativity.

Works 
"Vagif Mustafazade", "Niyazi", "Jafar Jabbarly", "Aliagha Vahid", "Arif Malikov", "Rashid Behbudov", "Vajiha Samadova" are his famous portraits. After his creative trips to regions of Azerbaijan he created "Snow in Baku", "Caspian Sea", "Absheron", "Winter in Baku", "Spring", "A Hot Day", "Winter", "Mashtagha Village", "Buzovna Village", "Evening Time" and other paintings. Asaf Jafarov had also historical paintings like "Nasimi is in the assembly of free thinkers" and "Awakening".

The artist has participated in many international exhibitions, and won the "Grand Prix" at "The World Art Exhibition" in Austria (1980).

Death 
Asaf Jafarov died on April 3, 2000 in Baku.

References

1927 births
2000 deaths
Portrait painters
Landscape painters
Still life painters
Artists from Baku
People's Artists of Azerbaijan
Soviet Azerbaijani people
20th-century Azerbaijani painters
Honored Art Workers of the Azerbaijan SSR